Joshua Whitehead is a Canadian First Nations, two spirit poet and novelist.

An Oji-Cree member of the Peguis First Nation in Manitoba, he began publishing poetry while pursuing undergraduate studies at the University of Winnipeg.

After he started graduate studies in indigenous literature at the University of Calgary, Talonbooks published his debut poetry collection Full-Metal Indigiqueer in 2017. The book initially received a Lambda Literary Award nomination for Transgender Poetry at the 30th Lambda Literary Awards in 2018, although Whitehead withdrew the book from consideration as the category was a misrepresentation of his identity as a two-spirit, not transgender, person.

His debut novel, Jonny Appleseed, was published by Arsenal Pulp Press in 2018. In the same year, he was named a finalist for the Dayne Ogilvie Prize for Canadian LGBTQ writers, and the book was named as a longlisted nominee for the 2018 Scotiabank Giller Prize and a shortlisted finalist for the Governor General's Award for English-language fiction at the 2018 Governor General's Awards and the 2019 Amazon.ca First Novel Award. The book won the Lambda Literary Award for Gay Fiction at the 31st Lambda Literary Awards. Jonny Appleseed won the 2021 Canada Reads competition, championed by Kawennáhere Devery Jacobs.

Love After the End: An Anthology of Two-Spirit and Indigiqueer Speculative Fiction, an anthology edited by Whitehead, was named the winner of the Lambda Literary Award for LGBTQ Anthology at the 33rd Lambda Literary Awards in 2021. Writers featured in the anthology include Nathan Niigan Noodin Adler, Darcie Little Badger, Gabriel Castilloux Calderon, Adam Garnet Jones, Mari Kurisato, Kai Minosh Pyle, David Alexander Robertson, jaye simpson and Nazbah Tom.

References

External links

 

21st-century Canadian novelists
21st-century Canadian poets
Canadian male novelists
Canadian male poets
First Nations novelists
First Nations poets
Lambda Literary Award winners
LGBT First Nations people
Canadian LGBT novelists
Canadian LGBT poets
Two-spirit people
University of Winnipeg alumni
University of Calgary alumni
Writers from Manitoba
Writers from Winnipeg
Living people
Queer writers
21st-century First Nations writers
Oji-Cree people
1989 births
Academic staff of the University of Calgary
21st-century Canadian LGBT people